All Our Kings Are Dead is the debut studio album by English alternative rock band Young Guns. It was released on 12 July 2010 and includes the singles "Winter Kiss", "Sons of Apathy", "Crystal Clear" and "Stitches", as well as "Weight of the World".

Writing and recording
The album was influenced by Finch's What It Is to Burn (2002).

Release and promotion
The album was first released on 12 July 2010. The album entered the UK Album Charts at #43, and the UK Independent Album Charts at #5 and #15 respectively. To promote the album, throughout the release year, and into 2011, the band released five singles from the album - "Winter Kiss", "Sons of Apathy", "Crystal Clear", "Stitches", and "Weight of the World". On 10 July 2011, the album was re-released as All Our Kings Are Dead: Gold Edition, including both the original album as well as a bonus DVD containing three acoustic sessions, three live videos, a documentary, and the music videos for all five singles.

Critical reception

The album received generally positive reviews. AllMusic stated that "Gustav Wood's passionate soaring vocals and heartfelt lyrics ensure that Young Guns offer enough variation to stand out from their counterparts".

Track list
All music written by Young Guns, all lyrics written by Gustav Wood.

Personnel
Young Guns
Gustav Wood - lead vocals
Fraser Taylor - lead guitar
John Taylor - rhythm guitar, backing vocals
Simon Mitchell - bass guitar
Ben Jolliffe - drums, percussion, backing vocals
Other contributors
Dan Weller – production, mixing
Ciaran Cahill – additional string arrangements
Dick Beetham – mastering
Paul Jackson – artwork
Mark James – management
Andy Snape – management

References
Citations

Sources

2010 debut albums
Young Guns (band) albums
Albums produced by Dan Weller